Erik Pausin (18 April 1920 – May 1997) was an Austrian pair skater. With his sister Ilse Pausin, he won the silver medal at the 1936 Winter Olympics at age 15, became one of the youngest male figure skating Olympic medalists. They won five consecutive silver medals (1935–1939) at the World Figure Skating Championships and three consecutive silver medals (1937–1939) at the European Figure Skating Championships. In 1939, they competed representing Nazi Germany, which swept the Worlds pairs podium that year.

Results
(with Ilse Pausin)

References

 Skatabase: 1930s Worlds
 Skatabase: 1930s Europeans
 Skatabase: 1930s Olympics

External links
 Database Olympics profile

1920 births
1997 deaths
Austrian male pair skaters
German male pair skaters
Olympic figure skaters of Austria
Olympic silver medalists for Austria
Figure skaters at the 1936 Winter Olympics
Olympic medalists in figure skating
World Figure Skating Championships medalists
European Figure Skating Championships medalists
Medalists at the 1936 Winter Olympics